Ijaz Hussain Khan (9 November 1938 – 27 June 2019) was a Pakistani cricketer who played for Lahore and Pakistan Railways between 1961/62 and 1973/74.

Born in the aristocrat Burki family in Jalandhar, Khan received his education at Government College, Lahore.

References

1938 births
2019 deaths
Pakistani cricketers
Lahore cricketers
Pakistan Railways cricketers
People from Jalandhar
Burki family
Government College University, Lahore alumni